The 2021 Tunbridge Wells Borough Council election took place on 6 May 2021 to elect one third of Tunbridge Wells Borough Council in England.<ref name="Tunbridge Wells Borough Council"

Results summary

Ward results

Benenden and Cranbrook

Brenchley and Horsmonden

Broadwater

Capel

Culverden

Goudhurst and Lamberhurst

Hawkhurst and Sandhurst

Paddock Wood West

Pantiles and St. Mark's

Park

Pembury

Rusthall

Sherwood

Southborough and High Brooms

Speldhurst and Bidborough

St. James

St. John's

By-elections

Speldhurst & Bidborough

References

Tunbridge
Tunbridge Wells Borough Council elections